was a Japanese football player who represented the Japan national team. His brother Shogo Kamo also played for Japan national team.

National team career

Kamo was born in Hamamatsu on February 8, 1915. In 1936, when he was a Waseda University student, he was selected for tge Japan national team for the 1936 Summer Olympics in Berlin. He debuted against Sweden at this competition on August 4. Japan completed a come-from-behind victory against Sweden. The first victory in the Olympics for Japan and a historic victory over one of the powerhouses became later known as "Miracle of Berlin" (ベルリンの奇跡) in Japan. On August 7, he also played against Italy. He played two games for Japan in 1936. His younger brother Shogo Kamo was also an Olympic footballer for Japan.  In 2016, this team was selected for the Japan Football Hall of Fame. 

On March 26, 2004, Kamo died of heart failure at Miyamae Hospital in Kawasaki at the age of 89. He was the last surviving member of his team from the 1936 Olympics.

National team statistics

References

External links

 
 Japan National Football Team Database
Japan Football Hall of Fame (Japan team at 1936 Olympics) at Japan Football Association

1915 births
2004 deaths
Waseda University alumni
Association football people from Shizuoka Prefecture
Japanese footballers
Japan international footballers
Olympic footballers of Japan
Footballers at the 1936 Summer Olympics
Association football forwards